The English Football League play-offs for the 2018–19 season 
(referred to as the Sky Bet Play-Offs for sponsorship reasons) were held in April 2019 with all finals played at Wembley Stadium in London. The play-offs will begin in each league with two semi-finals played over two legs. The teams who finish in 3rd, 4th, 5th and 6th place in the Championship and League One and the 4th, 5th, 6th and 7th-placed teams in League Two are set to compete. The winners of the semi-finals advance to the finals, with the winners gaining promotion for the following season.

Background
The English Football League play-offs have been held every year since 1987. They take place for each division following the conclusion of the regular season and are contested by the four clubs finishing below the automatic promotion places. The fixtures are determined by final league position – in the Championship and League One this is 3rd v 6th and 4th v 5th, while in League Two it is 4th v 7th and 5th v 24th And 22nd Vs 23rd In Relegation Playoffs

Championship

Championship semi-finals

First leg

Second leg

West Bromwich Albion 2–2 Aston Villa on aggregate. Aston Villa won 4–3 on penalties.

Derby County won 4–3 on aggregate.

Championship final

League One

League One semi-finals

First leg

Second leg

Sunderland won 1–0 on aggregate.

Charlton Athletic 4–4 Doncaster Rovers on aggregate. Charlton Athletic won 4–3 on penalties.

League One final

League Two

League Two semi-finals

First leg 

Second leg

Mansfield Town 1–1 Newport County on aggregate. Newport County won 5–3 on penalties.

Tranmere Rovers won 2–1 on aggregate.

League Two final

References

 
Play-offs
English Football League play-offs
English Football League play-offs